The 2017 Big 12 Conference football season was the 22nd season of Big 12 Conference football, taking place during the 2017 NCAA Division I FBS football season. The season began with non-conference play on Saturday, September 2, 2017, when all 10 of the league's teams played their first non-conference opponents. Big 12 Conference play began on Saturday, September 23, 2017.

The 2017 season was the sixth for the Big 12 since the 2010–13 Big 12 Conference realignment brought the Big 12 membership to its current form. The conference had ten members: Baylor, Iowa State, Kansas, Kansas State, Oklahoma, Oklahoma State, TCU, Texas, Texas Tech and West Virginia. The Big 12 is a Power Five conference under the College Football Playoff format, along with the ACC, the Big Ten, the Pac-12 and the SEC.

As a ten-team league, the Big 12 will played a nine-game, round-robin conference schedule.  Each member will played three non-conference games–one of was required to be against another Power Five conference foe. The regular season was followed by a conference championship game played between the regular season champion and regular season runner-up. The 2017 Big 12 Championship Game was held Saturday, December 2, 2017, at AT&T Stadium in Arlington, Texas.

Preseason

Recruiting

Preseason poll
The 2017 Big12 Preseason media poll was announced on July 13, 2017 prior to the Big12 media days.  The Big12 media days were held from July 17–18 in Frisco, Texas.  Oklahoma was selected as preseason champions for the fifth time since 2011.

 Oklahoma – 303 (19)
 Oklahoma State – 294 (12)
 Kansas State – 231 (1)
 Texas – 213
 TCU – 202
 West Virginia – 183
 Baylor – 129
 Texas Tech – 85
 Iowa State – 83
 Kansas – 37

First place votes in 

Preseason awards
2017 Preseason All-Big 12

Offensive Player of the Year: Baker Mayfield, Oklahoma, QB
Defensive Player of the Year: Dorance Armstrong Jr.,  Kansas, LB
Newcomer of the Year: Will Grier, West Virginia, QB

Schedule

Regular season

Week 1
Schedule and results:

Week 2
Schedule and results:

Week 3
Schedule and results:

Week 4
Schedule and results:

Week 5
Schedule and results:

Week 6
Schedule and results:

Week 7
Schedule and results:

Week 8
Schedule and results:

Week 9
Schedule and results:

Week 10
Schedule and results:

Week 11
Schedule and results:

Week 12
Schedule and results:

Week 13
Schedule and results:

Championship game

Week 14 (Big 12 Championship Game)
Schedule and results:

Big 12 vs other conferences

Big 12 vs Power 5 matchups
This is a list of the power conference teams (ACC, Big Ten, Pac-12 and SEC along with independents Notre Dame and BYU) the Big 12 plays in the non-conference (Rankings from the AP Poll):

Records against other conferences

Regular Season

Post Season

Rankings

Postseason

Bowl games

* Rankings based on CFP rankings, Big 12 team is bolded

Awards and honors

Player of the week honors
Following each week's games, Big 12 conference officials select the players of the week from the conference's teams.

Postseason awards
2017 Consensus All-Americans

The following Big 12 players were named to the 2017 College Football All-America Team by the Walter Camp Football Foundation (WCFF), Associated Press (AP), Football Writers Association of America (FWAA), Sporting News (SN), and American Football Coaches Association (AFCA):

Academic All-America Team Member of the Year (CoSIDA)

2017 All-Big 12

Offensive Player of the Year: Baker Mayfield, Oklahoma 
Defensive Player of the Year: Ogbo Okoronkwo, Oklahoma  Malik Jefferson,  Texas 
Offensive Freshman of the Year: Charlie Brewer, Baylor  Jalen Reagor, TCU
Defensive Freshman of the Year: Ross Blacklock, TCU  Kenneth Murray, Oklahoma 
Offensive Lineman of the Year: Orlando Brown, Oklahoma 
Defensive Lineman of the Year: Poona Ford, Texas
Offensive Newcomer of the Year: Will Grier, WVU
Defensive Newcomer of the Year: Ben Banogu, TCU
Special Teams Player of the Year: Michael Dickson, Texas
Coach of the Year: Matt Campbell, Iowa State

All-Academic
First team

National award winners

Home game attendance

Bold – Exceed capacity
†Season High

References